The following are the currently used insignia emblems and badges of the Argentine Army.

Military of Argentina

Argentine Army

Branch Insignia 
Branch insignia refers to emblems that may be worn on the uniform to denote membership in a particular area of expertise. 
Army branch insignia is separate from Army qualification badges in that qualification badges require completion of a training course or school, whereas branch insignia is issued to a service member upon assignment to a particular area of the Army.

The following are the currently used branch insignia emblems of the Argentine Army:
 Infantry
 Artillery
 Cavalry
 Communications
 Engineers

Services 
The following are the currently used service insignia emblems of the Argentine Army:
 Sanidad
 Military Justice
 Bandas
 Veterinaria
 Educación física
 Servicio Religioso

Special Qualifications 
The following are the currently used special qualifications (Especialidades) insignia emblems of the Argentine Army:
 Argentine Army Aviation Badge 
 Military Aviator Badge
 Paratroopers Badge
 Commandos Badge
 Mountain Troops Badge
 Jungle Troops Badge
 Intelligence Badge
 Air Assault Badge
 Intendencia
 Arsenal
 Motorist Driver
 Motorised Infantry

Argentine Air Force 

 Fighter Pilot
 Transport Pilot
 Special Operations Group (Argentina) (GOE)

Argentine Navy

Argentine Naval Aviation

Argentine Marines

See also
 List of military decorations

Military ranks of Argentina
Orders, decorations, and medals of Argentina